Blackhall Colliery is a village on the North Sea coast of County Durham, in England. It is situated on the A1086 between Horden and Hartlepool.  To the south of the Blackhall Colliery's Catholic church is Blackhall Rocks.

Built around the once extensive mining industry, Blackhall's colliery closed in 1981. Daniel Hall was one of the founding fathers of the colliery and invested heavily in the establishment of the mining infrastructure in the area. It is believed but unconfirmed that the name Black-Hall was established as a result of Daniels alias 'Black' due to his association with the mining of coal and his surname Hall. In 1991 a local campaign to erect a statue of Mr Hall was unsuccessful due to a lack of available funding from the local Authority. There is now an industrial estate built over part of the old colliery buildings, the colliery itself was pulled down in the 1980s. Blackhall Colliery is on the edge of Castle Eden Dene, and Castle Eden Dene Mouth.

Over the past couple of decades, there have been many changes. Following the closure of the colliery, the once busy village has economically gone downhill.  As time has passed since the closure, other industries have now begun to emerge to once again create employment in the region.

With both Blackhall Colliery and Blackhall Rocks being on the main road to Peterlee and Hartlepool. This has meant that these villages have become commuter villages, supplying workers for the now busy and expanding call centres in the nearby towns of Hartlepool and Peterlee.

Blackhall beach

Blackhall beach made a notable appearance in the 1971 film Get Carter; in the climactic scenes the main character is involved in a chase across a coal-strewn beach. The film shows the beach black with coal spoilings, dumped there by mine's conveyor system.  Since the mine closed, £10 million has been spent removing the conveyor and its massive concrete tower and cleaning tons of coal waste from the beach, which is now pristine.

Blackhall beach, along with the village itself, was used for the setting of the 2019 book Tainted Water by Dan Farrell.

Neighbouring beaches of Blackhall Colliery is a narrow strip of Peterlee then Horden beach (North) and Crimdon beach (South), both are within 30 minutes of walking distance each way from the beach. The continuation of the improving regenerative beach can be seen via the coastline.

Photo gallery

See also
Blackhall Colliery Welfare F.C.
Blackhall Colliery railway station

References

External links
Blackhall Colliery from the Durham Mining Museum

Villages in County Durham
Coal mines in County Durham
Populated coastal places in County Durham
Mining communities in England
Former mines in England